Zarinja is a village in the Talin Municipality of the Aragatsotn Province of Armenia. The village contains the seventh-century church of Saint Khach, rebuilt in the tenth century.

References 
 
 

Populated places in Aragatsotn Province